The Ghurian District (Ghoryan District) is an Afghan administrative district (Wuleswali) in far western Afghanistan in western Herat Province. The district is bordered by Iran to the west and northwest. It is then bordered by other districts of Herat, Kohsan District in the north, Zendeh Jan District to the east, and Adraskan District to the south. The Hari River flows through the northeastern end of the district. The border with Iran is marshy. The population is 85,900 (est. 2012) and the district center is the city of Ghurian.

Economy 
After the 1992 fall of the Najibullah government, and with the final withdrawal of Soviet military aid, Iran began repatriating Afghan refugees. Many refugees who returned to Ghurian after working as migrants in Iran's saffron industry came with corms and the skills to grow and produce saffron. The United Nations, the World Bank, and later governments supported growing saffron as a crop that is economically competitive with opium poppies and, importantly for the arid west, also requires less water than wheat growing. Ghurian farmers led in bringing a small but viable saffron trade to Herat Province.

References

External links

Districts of Herat Province